Thomas Lyte is an English luxury brand specialising in gold and silverware, sporting trophies and leather accessories.

The company has designed, made or restored many well known trophies and medals, such as the football’s FA Cup, golf’s Ryder Cup and rugby’s RBS 6 Nations and Webb Ellis Rugby World Cup and the Louis Vuitton America's Cup Challenger Playoff Trophy.

Royal Warrant Holders

In January 2015 Queen Elizabeth II appointed a Royal Warrant to Thomas Lyte as Goldsmiths and Silversmiths. Granted for a five-year period to the firm and founder Kevin Baker as a grantee, the appointment recognises that Thomas Lyte has been a direct supplier and restorer of silverware to the Royal Household since 2010.

History and heritage

Thomas Lyte was founded by Kevin Baker in 2007.

Its products are designed and created in the company’s London-based leather atelier and silversmith workshop. Thomas Lyte is named after the Lyte Jewel, which was made by miniaturist Nicholas Hilliard.

The Football Association Charity Shield

In 2016, Thomas Lyte restored and rebuilt the Football Association's original 1908 Charity Shield, the replacement of which is known as the FA Community Shield, to mark 50 years since England Captain Bobby Moore and his teammates beat West Germany in the 1966 FIFA World Cup.

The trophy raised £40,000 at auction on 10 October 2016, in aid of the Bobby Moore Fund for Cancer Research UK, which was set up by the footballer's widow Stephanie Moore to fund research into bowel cancer, after her husband died of the disease in 1993. The auction was held at The Royal Garden Hotel in Kensington, where the England team celebrated the 1966 victory. The Bobby Moore Fund became the FA's new charity partner in July 2016.

List of trophies, awards and medals
Trophies

Awards

Medals

References

External links 
 Official website

Luxury brands
Design companies of the United Kingdom
Companies based in the London Borough of Hammersmith and Fulham
Sports trophies and awards
Design companies established in 2007
British companies established in 2007